Scouts Vietnamiens de France (Vietnamese Scouts of France, ASVD) is a French Scouting organization for boys and girls of Vietnamese descent between 8 and 21 years old. It is an associate member of the Fédération du Scoutisme Français (Federation of French Scouting) and through this a member of both the World Association of Girl Guides and Girl Scouts and the World Organization of the Scout Movement.

Ideals and methods
The Scout Motto is Sắp Sẵn, translating as Be Prepared in Vietnamese. The Scout emblem incorporates the red lotus, the Vietnamese national flower.

See also
Scouting in France

References

External links
  

Scouting and Guiding in France
World Association of Girl Guides and Girl Scouts member organizations
World Organization of the Scout Movement member organizations
Overseas Vietnamese organizations
Exile organizations